Burtonville or Burtonsville may refer to:

Places
Canada
Burtonsville, Alberta

United States
Burtonsville, Maryland, a census-designated place
Burtonville, Ohio, an unincorporated community in Clinton County
Burtonville, Virginia, an unincorporated community in Greene County